IMR may refer to:

Organisations
 Imperial Military Railways, of British forces in South Africa 1898-1901
 Isle of Man Railway
 Industrija Motora Rakovica
 International Mineral Resources
 Institute for Materials Research, or Kinken in Japan
 Institute of Marine Research, in Norway
 Institute of Modern Russia
 International Marketing Review

Science, technology and engineering
 Infant mortality rate
 Interrupt mask register, in computing is used to disable interrupts
 Interlocking machine room of the London Underground signalling system
 Inverse Mills ratio, in statistics and graphs
 Improved Military Rifle, a type of gunpowder
 IMR vessel (Inspection, Maintenance and Repair)

Other uses
 Ideomotor response, in hypnosis and psychological research
Individual ministerial responsibility, a political convention in Parliamentary systems of Government 
 Institutional mode of representation, in film theory
 In Medias Res (band), Vancouver, Canada
 International Migration Review, quarterly peer-reviewed academic journal published by Wiley-Blackwell

See also
 IMR-1, 2, and 3, armored engineering vehicles (Inzhenernaya mashina razgrazhdeniya), based on the Russian T-55, T-72, and T-90 tanks, respectively